The Anthology is a compilation album by Joe Cocker, covering his career between 1964 and 1982. It was released in 1999 (see 1999 in music).

Track listing

Disc 1
"I'll Cry Instead" – 1:43
"Marjorine" – 2:41
"Bye Bye Blackbird" – 3:30
"Just Like a Woman" – 5:20
"Feelin' Alright" – 4:11
"Do I Still Figure in Your Life" – 4:01
"Don't Let Me Be Misunderstood" – 4:43
"With a Little Help from My Friends" – 5:13
"Delta Lady" – 2:52
"She Came in Through the Bathroom Window" – 2:40
"Hitchcock Railway" – 4:40
"Something" – 3:35
"Dear Landlord" – 3:25
"Darling Be Home Soon" – 4:43
"The Letter" – 4:10
"Space Captain (live)" – 4:11
"Honky Tonk Women" (live) – 4:30
"Cry Me a River" (live) – 3:57
"Let's Go Get Stoned" (live) – 7:34

Disc 2
"Pardon Me Sir" – 3:19
"High Time We Went" – 4:30
"Black-Eyed Blues" – 4:38
"Something to Say" – 5:25
"Put Out the Light" – 4:13
"I Can Stand a Little Rain" – 3:33
"You Are So Beautiful" – 2:45
"I Think It's Going to Rain Today" – 4:01
"Jamaica Say You Will" – 4:17
"The Jealous Kind" – 3:50
"Catfish" – 5:24
"A Song for You" – 6:27
"Fun Time" – 2:40
"I'm So Glad I'm Standing Here Today" (featuring The Crusaders) – 5:06
"Sweet Little Woman" – 4:02
"Many Rivers to Cross" – 3:45
"Talking Back to the Night" – 4:49
"Up Where We Belong" (featuring Jennifer Warnes) – 3:52

Charts

References

Joe Cocker compilation albums
1999 compilation albums
A&M Records compilation albums